Amici miei – Come tutto ebbe inizio is a 2011 Italian comedy film directed by Neri Parenti.

The film is meant to be a tribute to Mario Monicelli's classic comedy My Friends (1975) and its two sequels, and it is set in 15th-century Florence. The main plot of the film is based on an Italian Renaissance novella known as Novella del Grasso legnaiuolo ("Tale of the Fat Carpenter").

Cast

References

External links

2011 films
Films directed by Neri Parenti
2010s Italian-language films
2011 comedy films
Italian comedy films
Films set in Florence
Films shot in Tuscany
Films shot in Rome
Films set in the 1480s
Films set in the 15th century
2010s Italian films